is an upcoming 2023 action-adventure game developed by Nintendo EPD and published by Nintendo for the Nintendo Switch. A sequel to The Legend of Zelda: Breath of the Wild (2017), Tears of the Kingdom retains many aspects of its predecessor, including the open-world environment of Hyrule, which is expanded to allow for more vertical exploration. Link, the protagonist of Tears of the Kingdom, is joined by Zelda and is opposed by a malevolent force that seeks the destruction of Hyrule.

Following the completion of Breath of the Wild's development in 2017, a sequel was conceived after the game's downloadable content (DLC) was unable to contain all ideas put forth by the development team. Breath of the Wild director Hidemaro Fujibayashi and producer Eiji Aonuma reprise their roles in Tears of the Kingdom. A teaser trailer for Tears of the Kingdom was aired during E3 2019, a full reveal was aired at E3 2021, and the game's title was revealed during a September 2022 Nintendo Direct. While Tears of the Kingdom was initially planned for release in 2022, it is currently scheduled for release on May 12, 2023.

Development
Development started in 2017 after The Legend of Zelda: Breath of the Wild was completed. The game was announced at E3 2019 as a sequel to Breath of the Wild. At E3 2021, Nintendo debuted a trailer revealing gameplay, story elements and a 2022 release date, but Nintendo later changed the release date to Q2 2023. More information was revealed in the Nintendo Direct presentation held in September 2022, including the title Tears of the Kingdom and a release date of May 12, 2023, and another Nintendo Direct in February 2023 teased more gameplay elements.

Breath of the Wild director Hidemaro Fujibayashi and Zelda producer Eiji Aonuma are reprising their roles. The game was conceived after the team was unable to use every idea planned for Breath of the Wild downloadable content. New elements include floating islands above Hyrule, with players able to soar between them in a style similar to The Legend of Zelda: Skyward Sword (2011). 

In an interview with IGN, Aonuma stated that the open world games Red Dead Redemption 2 and The Elder Scrolls V: Skyrim inspired members of the development team.

Awards

Notes

References

Action-adventure games
Fantasy video games
Golden Joystick Award winners
Nintendo Entertainment Planning & Development games
Nintendo Switch games
Nintendo Switch-only games
Open-world video games
Post-apocalyptic video games
Single-player video games
Tears of the Kingdom
Upcoming video games scheduled for 2023
Video game sequels
Video games developed in Japan
Video games with cel-shaded animation
Video games with time manipulation
The Game Awards winners